List of high schools in Washington may refer to:

 List of high schools in Washington (state)
 List of high schools in Washington, D.C.